Ulrich Peltzer (born 9 December 1956) is a German novelist.

Life

Peltzer was born in Krefeld. Starting in 1975, he studied philosophy and social psychology in Berlin. He graduated as a psychologist in 1982. Since then he has been working as a full-time author.

, he has written five novels. Four of them deal with his experiences in Berlin, but one takes place in New York (Bryant Park). Peltzer usually rejects conventional, realistic descriptions of reality. Instead, his characters are depicted through a stream-of-consciousness technique.

Peltzer lives in Berlin.

Awards
Peltzer has received several awards:
1992 Bertelsmann-award at the Ingeborg Bachmann Prize in Klagenfurt
1996 Berliner Literaturpreis of the Stiftung Preußische Seehandlung
1997 Anna Seghers Prize
2000 Preis der SWR-Bestenliste
2001 Niederrheinischer Literaturpreis of the city of Krefeld 
2003 Bremer Literaturpreis
2008 Berliner Literaturpreis for lifetime achievement
2009/2010 Stadtschreiber von Bergen
2015 Franz-Hessel-Preis
2016 Kranichsteiner Literaturpreis

Novels
Die Sünden der Faulheit (The Sins of Laziness), Zürich: Ammann Verlag (1987), .
Stefan Martinez, Zürich: Ammann Verlag (1995), .
Alle oder keiner (All or No One), Zürich: Ammann Verlag (2000), .
Bryant Park, Zürich: Ammann Verlag (2002), .
Teil der Lösung, Zürich: Ammann Verlag (2007) .
 Published in English as Part of the Solution. Calcutta, London, New York: Seagull Books (2011). University of Chicago Pr. (2019), .
Das bessere Leben, Frankfurt am Main: S. Fischer (2015), .

Interviews
 Ich setze mich einfach hin und fange an (I simply sit down and start) – Interview, in: BELLA triste Nr. 10, 2004.

References

External links

Peltzer's biography (German)
Ulrich Peltzer in: NRW Literatur im Netz 

20th-century German novelists
21st-century German novelists
People from Krefeld
Members of the Academy of Arts, Berlin
1956 births
Living people
German male novelists
20th-century German male writers
21st-century German male writers